Niță is a Romanian surname which may refer to:

Constantin Niță (born 1955), economist and politician
Florin Niță (born 1987), footballer
Norbert Niță (born 1972), retired footballer
Robert Niță (born 1977), retired footballer
Sergiu Niţă (1883–1940), politician and lawyer

See also

Romanian-language surnames